The men's light heavyweight Low-Kick category at the W.A.K.O. World Championships 2007 in Belgrade was the fourth-heaviest of the male Low-Kick tournaments, involving seventeen fighters from three continents (Europe, Asia and Africa).  Each of the matches was three rounds of two minutes each and were fought under Low-Kick rules.

As there were too few fighters for a tournament of thirty-two, fifteen of the fighters received byes through to the second round.  The tournament champion was Serbia's Nenad Pagonis who won the gold by defeating Azerbaijan's Rail Rajabov in the final via split decision.  Defeated semi finalists, Dénes Rácz from Hungary and Viktor Nordh from Sweden received bronze medals.

Results

Key

See also
List of WAKO Amateur World Championships
List of WAKO Amateur European Championships
List of male kickboxers

References

External links
 WAKO World Association of Kickboxing Organizations Official Site

Kickboxing events at the WAKO World Championships 2007 Belgrade
2007 in kickboxing
Kickboxing in Serbia